The Ministry of Housing and Urbanism of Chile (MINVU) is an institution in charge of the agriculture and livestock in Chile. It was created in 1924 under the name of Ministry of Agriculture, Industry and Colonization; its current name was established in 1930.

Its current minister is Esteban Valenzuela.

List of representatives

References

External Link
 

Government ministries of Chile
1924 establishments in Chile